Robin Mary Beauregard (born February 23, 1979 in Long Beach, California) is an American water polo player, who won the silver medal at the 2000 Summer Olympics. She also won a bronze medal at the 2004 Summer Olympics. Beauregard plays the position of center defender.

In addition to playing for the national team, Beauregard also played for UCLA. She was named the Most Outstanding Player at the 2003 NCAA Championships, where UCLA beat Stanford University by a score of 4-3. She was named 1st Team NCAA All-American three times while at UCLA.

Beauregard  attended Marina High School, which did not have a female water polo team until her junior year, and she played on its team of mostly male players.

In 2011, she was inducted into the USA Water Polo Hall of Fame.

Performances
 Olympic Games: Silver Medal (2000), Bronze Medal (2004)
 World Championships: Gold Medal (2003)
 Pan American Games: Second Place (1999)
 FINA World Cup: Second Place (2002)
 FINA World Championships: Fourth Place (2001)
 NCAA National Championship Team: 1998, 2001, 2003

See also
 United States women's Olympic water polo team records and statistics
 List of Olympic medalists in water polo (women)
 List of world champions in women's water polo
 List of World Aquatics Championships medalists in water polo

References

External links
 
 Robin Beauregard's U.S. Olympic Team bio
 Profile

1979 births
Living people
American female water polo players
UCLA Bruins women's water polo players
Water polo players at the 2000 Summer Olympics
Water polo players at the 2004 Summer Olympics
Olympic silver medalists for the United States in water polo
Olympic bronze medalists for the United States in water polo
Medalists at the 2004 Summer Olympics
World Aquatics Championships medalists in water polo
Medalists at the 2000 Summer Olympics
Sportspeople from Long Beach, California